Death Is Not the End can refer to:
"Death Is Not the End", a song by Bob Dylan from the album Down in the Groove (1988), covered by The Waterboys in 1986, Gavin Friday in 1989, and Nick Cave in 1996.
Death Is Not the End, an album by Shut Up and Dance (1992).
Death Is Not the End, a novella by Ian Rankin (1998).
"Death Is Not the End", an episode of the series True Blood (2014).